Conkey House is a historic home situated Lockport in Niagara County, New York.  It is a stone structure built in 1842 in the Federal style by James Conkey, an early settler of Lockport. It was owned by his descendants until the 1960s. It is one of approximately 75 stone residences remaining in the city of Lockport.

It was listed on the National Register of Historic Places in 2003.

References

External links
Conkey House - Lockport, NY - U.S. National Register of Historic Places on Waymarking.com

Houses on the National Register of Historic Places in New York (state)
Houses completed in 1842
Houses in Niagara County, New York
National Register of Historic Places in Niagara County, New York